Dagbladet (English:The Daily Paper) was an American daily newspaper published in the Norwegian language in Chicago from 1889–1891.

Peer Stromme was the founding editor of the newspaper. Stromme was also on the editorial staff of Norden (Chicago) from 1888–92.  Chicago was at that time the cultural center of Norwegian America with twice as many Norwegian speaking residents as in Minneapolis. Politically, Dagbladet was independent with socialist and pro-labor leanings. The paper favored social progress and tariff reform. Dagbladet also had a weekly edition, titled Nordisk Folkeblad.

References

Norwegian-language newspapers published in the United States
Defunct newspapers published in Chicago
Publications established in 1889
Publications disestablished in 1891
Norwegian-American culture in Chicago
Non-English-language newspapers published in Illinois
1889 establishments in Illinois
1891 disestablishments in Illinois